John Thomas Broomfield (October 9, 1889 – August 3, 1981) was a provincial politician from Alberta, Canada. He served as a member of the Legislative Assembly of Alberta from 1940 to 1944, sitting as an Independent member from the constituency of Okotoks-High River.

References

1981 deaths
1889 births
Independent Alberta MLAs